Chapman and Oxley was a Toronto-based architectural firm that was responsible for designing a number of prominent buildings in the city during the 1920s and 1930s. Even with the departure of Chapman, the firm's last projects appeared to be in the late 1940s.

History 
The firm was founded in 1919 by architects Alfred Hirschfelder Chapman (1875-1949) and James Morrow Oxley (1883-1957).

A.H. Chapman was born in Toronto to the Chapman family, owners of Grenadier Ice Company at Grenadier Pond (in what is now High Park) and Belle Ewart Ice Company (later as Chapmans Limited). Chapman apprenticed under architect Beaumont Jarvis (1864-1948). He then went to study architecture in Paris. From 1920 he was head of the family business, Chapmans Limited, which sold ice and fuel in Toronto. Chapman served as president of the Ontario Association of Architects for two consecutive periods, 1929 and 1930. Chapman retired in 1943 and died in 1949. He is buried at St. George's Church (Anglican) and Cemetery (Susan Sibbald Memorial Stone Church) in Sutton, Ontario.

Chapman's son Howard Dennison Chapman (1917-2014), also an architect, formed his own firm, Chapman and Hurst, and worked with Howard V. Walker on a number of buildings, such as the Riverdale Hospital, and on restoration projects in the 1980s (Koffler Student Centre, built by his father Alfred H. Chapman as Central Reference Library). Another son, Christopher Chapman (1927-2015), was a writer, director and cinematographer. His multi-award-winning documentary, "A Place to Stand", was nominated for two Oscars, winning one; Christopher's twin brother Francis Chapman (1927-2020) was also a noted filmmaker.

J.M. Oxley attended the University of Toronto as an engineering (applied sciences) student. He fought in World War I in the Canadian Expeditionary Force from 1915 to 1918. Oxley was also president of the Mississauga Golf & Country Club from 1939 to 1940. He died in 1957.

Projects 
A list of projects worked on by Chapman and Oxley:

A list of work by Chapman or Oxley prior to the founding of their firm in 1919:

See also
List of other Toronto architectural firms:
 Bregman + Hamann Architects
 Darling and Pearson
 WZMH Architects

References
 Christopher Chapman dies

Architecture firms of Canada